Qaleh-ye Tiskhani (also Romanized as Qal‘eh-ye Tīskhānī; also known as Qal‘eh-ye Ţīzkhānī, Tīskhānī, and Tīz Khānī) is a former village in Hamaijan Rural District, Hamaijan District, Sepidan County, Fars Province, Iran. At the 2006 census, its population was 336, in 74 families.  It has since been merged into the city of Hamashahr.

References 

Populated places in Sepidan County
Former populated places in Fars Province